Boulder Creek may refer to:

Australia 

 Boulder Creek, Queensland, a locality in the Rockhampton Region, Queensland

Canada 

Boulder Creek (British Columbia), a creek located in the Atlin Country region of British Columbia
Boulder Creek (Lillooet River) in the Pemberton Valley, British Columbia Canada
Boulder Creek Hot Springs, at Boulder Creek (Lillooet River) in the Pemberton Valley, British Columbia Canada
Boulder Creek Provincial Park in the Cassiar District of British Columbia
any one of 16 other Boulder Creeks in British Columbia, two each in Ontario and Albert and Nunavut, and five in Yukon

United States 
communities:
Boulder Creek, California
any of hundreds of streams, including:
Boulder Creek (California) in Santa Cruz County
 Boulder Creek (Fresno County, California)
Boulder Creek (Myer Creek tributary) in Imperial County, California
Boulder Creek (Colorado), a creek draining the Rocky Mountains to the west of Boulder, Colorado
Boulder Creek (South Dakota), a stream in the U.S. state of South Dakota
schools:
Boulder Creek High School (Arizona)